WOFN is a non-commercial FM radio station in Canton, Ohio, United States, broadcasting at 88.7 MHz devoted to religious programming. The station is owned by the Oasis Network, and it rebroadcasts the programming of KNYD 90.5 in Tulsa, Oklahoma. WOFN was licensed on November 24, 1997.

External links
 

OFN